Dernard E. Quarterman was an American Christian minister and politician.

Qiarterman was a pastor in the African Methodist Episcopal church.

He received 3,027 votes in 1877, and won election to the Florida House of Representatives from Leon County.

Further reading
Laborers in the Vineyard of the Lord: The Beginnings of the AME Church in Florida, 1865-1895 by Larry E. Rivers and Canter Brown, University Press of Florida, 2001

References

African-American state legislators in Florida
African-American politicians during the Reconstruction Era
Members of the Florida House of Representatives
19th-century American politicians
African Methodist Episcopal Church clergy
African Methodist Episcopal churches in Florida
People from Leon County, Florida
Year of birth missing
Year of death missing